John William Killilay (May 24, 1887 – October 21, 1968) was a pitcher in Major League Baseball who played for the Boston Red Sox during the  season. He was born in Leavenworth, Kansas.

Killilay posted a 4-2 with 28 strikeouts and a 3.54 ERA in 14 appearances, including seven starts, one complete game, and 61 innings of work.
 
Killilay died in Tulsa, Oklahoma at age 81.

External links

Retrosheet
Baseball Almanac

Boston Red Sox players
Major League Baseball pitchers
Baseball players from Kansas
Sportspeople from Leavenworth, Kansas
1887 births
1968 deaths
Austin Senators players
Dallas Giants players
Iola Grays players
Cherryvale Boosters players
Butte Miners players
Spokane Indians players
Oakland Oaks (baseball) players
San Francisco Seals (baseball) players
Salt Lake City Bees players
Great Falls Electrics players